Mehri or Mahri may refer to:

 Mehri people, an ethnic group of Oman and Yemen
 Mehri language, the Modern South Arabian language spoken by them
 Mahri, Jammu and Kashmir, a village in India

People 
 Abdelhamid Mehri (1926–2012), Algerian resistance fighter and politician
 Ahmed Mohammed Al Mahri (born 1988), UAE footballer
 Djilali Mehri (born 1937), Algerian executive
 Sulaiman Al Mahri (1480–1550), Arab navigator
 Mehri Yalfani, Persian-language writer

See also
 Mahra (disambiguation)

Language and nationality disambiguation pages